The Ligier JS35 was a Formula One car used by the Ligier team during the 1991 Formula One season.  It was updated to a 'B' spec during the season.  Its best finish in a race was seventh (twice).

Development
For the 1991 season, team owner Guy Ligier had secured the use of V12 engines from Lamborghini, which had been used the previous season by Team Lotus and Larrousse. This was to be a stopgap measure as for 1992, the team were to use Renault V10s.

The JS35 chassis was prepared by Ligier's design department under the direction of Michel Beaujon, Claude Galopin and Richard Divila, the latter two being fired after the disappointing start to the season.  The car was overweight and bulky from the start, not helped by the large oil tank required for the new engines.  Changes to the suspension for the start of the European leg of the season helped performance a little.  The chassis was later updated to a 'B' spec by new Ligier recruit Frank Dernie.  The JS35B, which made its debut at the French Grand Prix, also had some input from Gérard Ducarouge who was recruited mid-season.

Race history
 
The JS35 was driven by new Ligier drivers Thierry Boutsen, formerly of Williams, and Érik Comas, the 1990 F3000 champion.

Although Boutsen did not finish in the points during the season, he at least had the satisfaction of starting every race of the season, with a best qualification of 14th in Mexico.  Comas failed to qualify three times, including the season opening United States Grand Prix.  His best qualifying performance was at his home race in France where he started 14th.  Boutsen's best finish was seventh, achieved twice in the early part of the season with the original car.  Comas' best finish was in Canada where he finished eighth, having qualified 26th.

Complete Formula One results
(key) (results in bold indicate pole position; results in italics indicate fastest lap)

Notes

References
 

1991 Formula One season cars
Ligier Formula One cars